The year 1912 in film involved some significant events.



Events
 February – Babelsberg Studio outside Berlin begins operation with shooting of The Dance of the Dead (Der Totentanz) by Danish director Urban Gad starring Asta Nielsen (released September 7).
 April 15 - The Titanic, a British passenger liner, sinks in the Atlantic Ocean, killing more than 1,500 passengers. It is depicted in many works of popular culture, including films.
 April 30 – Universal Film Manufacturing Company is founded in New York, the oldest surviving film studio in the United States.
 May 8 – Famous Players Film Company, the forerunner of Paramount Pictures, is founded by Adolph Zukor.
 May 18 – Shree Pundalik by Dadasaheb Torne, the first Indian film, is released.
 June 8 – New York Motion Picture Company is merged with Universal, giving Universal a studio in Edendale, Los Angeles.
 July 4 – Mack Sennett, who has previously worked as an actor and comedy director with D. W. Griffith, forms a new company with New York City entrepreneur Adam Kessel, Keystone Studios. It will play an important role in developing slapstick comedy as the home to the Keystone Cops, English actor Charlie Chaplin, and others.
 July 12 – Queen Elizabeth is the first film released by Famous Players.
 July 26 – Edison Studios releases What Happened to Mary, the first ever motion picture serial.
 Edison introduces the Home Kinetoscope, a home film-projector which uses a 22 mm print consisting of three rows of frames.
 Pathé releases Pathe Kok, their first entry into the amateur market, with a gauge of 28 mm.
 Alexander F. Victor improves on the 17.5 mm format with his Duoscope, which uses two center perforations instead of the typical one.
 Bell & Howell introduce the first all-metal camera, the 2709 35mm.

Films released in 1912
1812, Russian film directed by Vasili Goncharov
All for a Girl, directed by Frederick A. Thompson
 Andalusian Superstition (French/Pathe) written and directed by Segundo de Chomon; filmed in hand-tinted color
At the Foot of the Ladder, produced by the Thanhouser Company
Aurora Floyd, directed by Theodore Marston
Baby Hands
The Bandit of Tropico
A Battle of Wits
The Beautiful Leukanida
 Bebe and Spiritualism (French/ Gaumont) directed by Louis Feuillade, starring child star Rene Dary and Paul Manson; this was one of a series of 64 films that featured the popular Bebe ("Baby") film character
The Belle of Bar-Z Ranch, directed by Thomas Ricketts
 Bertie's Book of Magic (British/ Hepworth) directed by Frank Wilson
 Billy's Seance (Universal/ IMP) starring John R. Cumpson and Charles Arling; a spoof on "seance films".
 The Brute (Champion Films) directed by Ulysses Davis, produced by Mark M. Dintenfass
A Business Buccaneer
The Cameraman's Revenge
Cleopatra, directed by Charles L. Gaskill and starring Helen Gardner; one of the earliest American feature films
Conductor 786, produced by the Thanhouser Company
 Conscience (Vitagraph), aka The Chamber of Horrors, produced by Albert E. Smith, directed by Maurice Costello, starring Rose Tapely and Robert Gaillard.
 Convicted by Hypnotism (French/ Eclair) aka A Double Life, directed by Victorin-Hippolyte Jasset, starring Cecile Guyon and Charles Krauss 
The County Fair
The Conquest of the Pole, aka A la conquete du Pole, directed by Georges Méliès (his last film).
 Curse of the Hindoo Pearl (American Standard Films) based on the 1868 Wilkie Collins novel The Moonstone
 Curse of the Lake (Vitagraph)
Custer's Last Fight, directed by Francis Ford
 Dante and Beatrice (Italian/ Ambrosio Prods.)
A Dash Through the Clouds, directed by Mack Sennett, starring Mabel Normand and American aviation pioneer Philip Parmelee.
The Deserter, directed by Thomas H. Ince
 The Diabolical Box (British/ Urbanora Films)
Dr. Jekyll and Mr. Hyde (Thanhouser) directed by Lucius Henderson, starring James Cruze and Marguerite Snow
 A Drama of the Castle; or, Do the Dead Return? (French) written and directed by Abel Gance
 El Fusilamiento de Jose Rizal, directed by Albert Yearsley
 The Fatal Pact (French/ Pathe) features a magic genie
 The Fatal Pearl (Italian/ Aquila) 
 Faust (British) produced by Charles Urban, filmed in Kinemacolor; (a lost film today).
 Feathertop (French/ U.S. co-production) produced by Eclair/ American Standard; starring Muriel Ostriche and Julia Stuart; based on the 1852 short story by Nathaniel Hawthorne.
The Female of the Species, directed by D. W. Griffith, starring Mary Pickford
The Fickle Spaniard, directed by Mack Sennett, starring Mabel Normand
For His Son, directed by D. W. Griffith, starring Blanche Sweet
For the Cause of the South, directed by Bannister Merwin, starring Laura Sawyer, Ben F. Wilson, Charles Ogle
Frankfurters and Quail
Friends, directed by D. W. Griffith, starring Mary Pickford and Lionel Barrymore
From the Manger to the Cross, directed by Sidney Olcott (One of the earliest American feature film.)
 Gavroche and the Ghosts, aka Gavroche and the Spirits (French/ Eclair) directed by Romeo Bosetti, starring Paul Bertho; one of a series of 40 short French silent films all featuring the comic character "Gavroche" 
Geronimo's Last Raid
 The Ghost of Sulphur Mountain (Star Film) directed by Gaston Méliès and Robert Goodman, starring Francis Ford 
 Ghosts (Essanay Films) starred Norman MacDonald and Joseph Allen Sr.
 Ghosts (British/ Hepworth) directed by Hay Plumb, starring Harry Buss and Ivy Close
The Girl and Her Trust, directed by D. W. Griffith, starring Dorothy Bernard and Wilfred Lucas
The Half-Breed's Way
 The Haunted House (French/ Pathe)
 The Herncrake Witch (British/ Heron Films) written and directed by Mark Melford, starring Jakidawdra Melford and produced by Andrew Heron 
 The Hindoo Charm (Lubin Films) directed by Maurice Costello (also star), also starring Clara Kimball Young and James Young
The Honor of the Family
 Hop o' My Thumb (French/ Gaumont) Based on the Perrault fairy tale
Hot Stuff, starring Mack Sennett, Mabel Normand, and Dell Henderson
How a Mosquito Operates
 An Indian Legend (Broncho/ Mutual Films) produced by Thomas H. Ince, directed by Francis Ford
Indian Romeo and Juliet
In Nacht und Eis
The Independence of Romania The first Romanian feature film to run for two hours.
 In the Grip of the Vampire (French/ Gaumont Films) written by Leonce Perret 
The Invaders
It Happened Thus
 Jack and the Beanstalk (produced by Thomas Edison)
Keystone Comedy
 The Knight of the Snows (French/ Pathe & Star Films) written and directed by George Melies
 La Vida de Jose Rizal, directed by Edward M. Gross
 La Vida y Muerte del Gran Martir Filipino, Dr. Jose Rizal, directed by Albert Yearsley
 The Lady of Shallot (British/ Hepworth) written and directed by Elwin Neame, based on the Lord Tennyson poem; starring Ivy Close.
The Land Beyond the Sunset
 The Legend of Cagliostro (Gaumont Films)
 The Legend of Sleepy Hollow (French/ Eclair & American Standard Films) directed by Etienne Arnaud, starring Alec B. Francis and Muriel Ostriche, based on the story by Washington Irving
Les Amours de la reine Élisabeth (released in the US as Queen Elizabeth), first film released by Famous Players Film Company, starring Sarah Bernhardt
The Lesser Evil, directed by D. W. Griffith, starring Blanche Sweet
 The Lion Tonic (Italian/ Cines)
The Little Girl Next Door
 The Live Man's Tomb (Italian/ Itala Films)
 Lucrezia Borgia (Italian/ Film d'Arte Films) directed by Gerolamo Lo Savio, written by Ugo Falena, starring Vittorio Lepanto as Lucrezia and Achille Vitti as Cesare.
Mabel's Lovers, directed by Mack Sennett, starring Mabel Normand
 Magical Matches (Urbanora Films)
 A Magnetic Influence (British/ Urbanora Films) produced by Charles Urban; yet another adaptation of the novel Trilby
Making An American Citizen
 Man's Genesis (Biograph) written and directed by D. W. Griffith, starring Robert Harron, Mae Marsh and Wilfred Lucas; this film was expanded in 1913 and re-released as The Primitive Man.
 The Mask of Horror (French/ Film Francais) written and directed by Abel Gance, starring Edouard de Max, Charles de Rochefort and Mathilde Thizeau (Gance's wife)
The Massacre, directed by D. W. Griffith, starring Blanche Sweet and Lionel Barrymore
Maud Muller
The Mender Of Nets, directed by D. W. Griffith, starring Mabel Normand and Mary Pickford
 Mephisto (British/ Charles Urban Prods.) filmed in Kinemacolor (a lost film today) 
The Miracle, the first full-color, full-length feature film (5,500 feet)
Das Mirakel
 The Mummy and the Cowpuncher (Kalem Films) a 5-minute Western-Comedy starring Ruth Roland and John E. Brennan
The Musketeers of Pig Alley, directed by D. W. Griffith, starring Lillian Gish
The Mystery of Souls (Italian/ Itala Films) directed by Vincenzo Denizot, starring Alessandro Bernard and Lydia Quaranta; seems to have been inspired by the novel "Trilby". 
 Mystery of the Glass Coffin (Eclair/ Tyler Films)
 The Mystical Maid of Jamasha Pass, directed by Allan Dwan (his first film), starring J. Warren Kerrigan and Jack Richardson.
 Nan in Fairyland (British/ C&M Films)
A New Cure for Divorce
The New York Hat, directed by D. W. Griffith, starring Mary Pickford and Lionel Barrymore
 Nursie and Knight (Thanhouser) dream sequence involves a dragon.
The Old Actor
The Old Doctor's Humanity
Oliver Twist (British/ Hepworth) directed by Thomas Bentley;  based on the novel by Charles Dickens
Onesime, Clock-maker, directed by Jean Durand
 One Too Exciting Night (British/ Hepworth Films) produced by Cecil Hepworth
 Paradise (Italian/ Psiche Film) based on the third act of Dante's Divine Comedy (sort of a sequel to Dante's Inferno)
 Parsifal (Italian/ Ambrosio) based on the opera by Wagner
The Passer-By, directed by Oscar Apfel.  Not the first moving camera shot or dolly shot, but notable for its use as dramatic emphasis.
Petticoat Camp
Pilgrim's Progress
 The Plague-Stricken City (French/ Gaumont) the filmmakers tried to emulate the 1912 Italian silent film Masque of the Red Death herein, which in turn was based on the famous story by Edgar Allan Poe
Please Help the Pore
 Polidor at the Death Club (Italian/ Pasquali Films) one of dozens of silent films featuring the "Polidor" character all starring Ferdinando Guillaume; this film was a spoof on the Robert Louis Stevenson novel The Suicide Club
The Power of Melody
A Primitive Man's Career to Civilization
Put Yourself in His Place
 The Queen of Spades (French/ Eclipse) This film was actually an adaptation of Robert Louis Stevenson's 1878 novel The Suicide Club, but the film also draws from the 1833 Alexander Pushkin novel Pikovaya dama as well.
 The Raven (Eclair/ American Standard) a French-American co-production purporting to be the "true story" of Edgar Allan Poe's life, starring Guy Oliver and Muriel Ostriche; inspired by the poem by Edgar Allan Poe and incorporating images from eight of Poe's short stories (filmed in Fort Lee, Texas)
 The Reincarnation of Karma (Vitagraph Films) directed by Van Dyke Brooke, starring Courtenay Foote and Rosemary Theby
Resurrection
Richard III (Second oldest American feature film.  Currently the oldest completely intact American feature film.)
Robin Hood
 St. George and the Dragon (Italian/ Milano Films) this film was hand-colored.
 Satan, aka Satana, aka Satan, the Destroyer of Humanity (Italian/ Ambrosio Films) directed by Luigi Maggi, written by Guido Volante, starring Rina Alby, Antonio Grisanti and Mario Bonnard (as Satan); photography by Giovanni Vitrotti; inspired by John Milton's Paradise Lost 
Saved From the Titanic
 The Sea's Shadow/ Der Schatten des Meeres, aka In the Shadow of the Sea (German) directed by Curt A. Stark (also star), also starring Lizzy Krueger, Henry Porten and Fran Retzlag; produced by Otto Messter.
 The Secrets of House Number Five (Russian-French co-production/ Pathe Films) said to be one of the first films to feature vampires
 The Serpents (Vitagraph) starring Ralph Ince and Edith Storey 
Sherlock Holmes Film Series (Eclair, British-French); a series of 8 Sherlock Holmes films directed by Georges Treville (who also played Holmes); includes "The Speckled Band", "Silver Blaze", "The Beryl Coronet", "The Musgrave Ritual", "The Reigate Squires", "The Stolen Papers", "The Boscombe Valley Muystery" and "The Copper Beeches"
 The Silent Castle (French/ Gaumont) based on the fairy tale Sleeping Beauty
 Simple Simon and the Devil, aka Onesime and the Devil (French/ Gaumont) directed by Jean Durand, starring Ernest Bourbon and Gaston Modot; one of a series of 60 "Onesime" films made in France (the character's name was changed to "Simple Simon" in the U.S.) 
A Six Cylinder Elopement
 The Skivvy's Ghost (French/ Lux Film) 
 Sleeping Beauty (British/ Hepworth Films) directed by Elwin Neame, starring Ivy Close; based on the Charles Perrault fairy tale
 A Son-in-Law's Nightmare (French/ Pathe)
A Spanish Dilemma, directed by Mack Sennett, starring Mabel Normand
 The Spectre of Jago (Italian/ Aquila Films) starring Alberto Carlo Lolli 
The Speed Demon, directed by Mack Sennett, starring Fred Mace
 The Spell of the Hypnotist (Italian/ Helios Film)
 A Spider in the Brain (Italian/ Itala Films)
 A Spiritualistic Convert (French/ Pathe)
 Spooks (French/ Pathe) a horror-comedy
Standing Room Only
The Star of Bethlehem
The Street Singer
 Supernatural Power (French/ Pathe) features a seance with spirits
 The System of Dr. Tarr and Professor Fether, aka The Lunatics (French/ Eclair) directed by Maurice Tourneur, written by Andre de Lord, starring Henri Gouget and Henri Roussell; based on the Edgar Allan Poe short story
The Tell-Tale Message
 Les terreurs de Rigadin (French/Pathe) directed by George Monca, starring Charles Prince as "Rigadin"; this film was one in a series of over 100 "Rigadin" comedies made in France.
 The Thief and the Porter's Head (Italian/ Milano Films)
The Thunderbolt
Tomboy Bessie, directed by Mack Sennett, starring Mabel Normand
 Trilby (Austrian-Hungarian co-production) directed by Luise and Anton Kolm (with Jakob Fleck), starring Elsa Galafrés Hubermann and Paul Askonas, based on the 1894 novel by George du Maurier
 Trilby (British/ Standard Films) based on the 1894 novel by George du Maurier 
 Undine (Thanhouser) directed by Lucius Henderson, starring Florence La Badie and Marguerite Snow; written by Lloyd Lonergan, based on the fairy tale “Undine” by Friedrich de la Motte Fouqué; released 9/24/12; prints exist in museums.
An Unseen Enemy, directed by D. W. Griffith, debuts of Lillian and Dorothy Gish
 The Vengeance of Edgar Poe (French/ Lux Film) directed by Gerard Bourgeois, written by Abel Gance and Bourgeois, starring Edouard de Max and Jean Worms; biopic that deals with Poe's real-life drug addiction.
 The Vengeance of Egypt (French/ Gaumont) 
The Voice of Conscience
The Water Nymph, starring Mabel Normand and Mack Sennett.  First Keystone comedy.
What Happened to Mary?, starring Mary Fuller.
 When Soul Meets Soul (Essanay Films) directed by Farrell MacDonald, starring Francis X. Bushman (features a reincarnated mummy)
When the Fire Bells Rang
When the Heart Calls, starring Lee Moran, Russell Bassett and Louise Glaum
 Whiffle's Nightmare, aka Le cauchemar de Rigadin (French/ Pathe) directed by George Monca, starring Charles Prince as Rigadin.
With Our King and Queen Through India
With the Mounted Police
 The Woman in White (Universal Pictures) starring Janet Salzberg, Charles Perley and Alexander F. Frank;  based on the famous 1859 Wilkie Collins novel of the same name.
 The Woman in White (Thanhouser Films) written by Lloyd Lonergan, starring Marguerite Snow and James Cruze; based on the famous 1859 Wilkie Collins novel of the same name.
 Yotsuya Kaidan (translation: The Ghost of Yotsuya) (Japanese/ Nikkatsu Films) directed by Shozo Makino, starring Matsunosuke Onoe; based on the famous 1825 kabuki play of the same name.
The Young Millionaire

Births
January 8 – José Ferrer, Puerto Rican-American actor and director (died 1992)
January 13 – Paul Birch, American actor (died 1969)
February 4 – James Craig, American actor (died 1985)
February 5 – Willard Parker, American actor (died 1996)
February 19 – Saul Chaplin, American film composer (died 1997)
February 19 – Dorothy Janis, American actress (died 2010)
February 21 – Arline Judge, American actress (died 1974)
February 26 – Dane Clark, American actor (died 1998)
March 22 – Karl Malden, American actor (died 2009)
April 5 – Gordon Jones, American actor (died 1963)
April 8 – Sonja Henie, Norwegian Olympic ice-skater, actress (died 1969)
April 11 - John Larkin, American actor (died 1965)
April 12 - Walt Gorney, Austrian-American actor (died 2004)
April 16 – Catherine Scorsese, American actress (died 1997)
April 18 – Wendy Barrie, English actress (died 1978)
April 29 – Richard Carlson, American actor and director (died 1977)
May 9 – Pedro Armendáriz, Mexican actor (died 1963)
May 18 – Perry Como, American singer, actor (died 2001)
May 23 
Marius Goring, English actor (died 1998)
John Payne, American actor (died 1989)
May 29 – Iris Adrian, American actress (died 1994)
May 31 – Dave O'Brien, American actor, director, writer (died 1969)
June 1 – Doris Wishman, American filmmaker (died 2002)
June 26 – Jay Silverheels, Canadian actor (Tonto)  (died 1980)
July 4 – Viviane Romance, French actress (died 1991)
July 5 – Ilona Massey, Hungarian-born American actress (died 1974)
August 1 – Henry Jones, American actor (died 1999)
August 12 – Samuel Fuller, American director (died 1997)
August 15 – Wendy Hiller, English actress (died 2003)
August 23 – Gene Kelly, American actor (died 1996)
August 25 - Ted Key, writer (died 2008)
August 29 – Barry Sullivan, American actor (died 1974)
September 5
Kristina Söderbaum, Swedish-born German actress (died 2001)
Frank Thomas, American animator (died 2004)
September 10 – Mary Walter, Filipina actress (died 1993)
September 21 – Chuck Jones, American animator (died 2002)
September 23 – Martha Scott, American actress (died 2003)
September 29 – Michelangelo Antonioni, Italian director (died 2007)
October 10 - Rudy Bond, American actor (died 1982)
October 11 – Betty Noyes American singer/dubber (died 1987)
October 12 – Peer Guldbrandsen, Danish screenwriter, actor, film director and producer (died 1996)
October 13 – Cornel Wilde, Hungarian-born American actor (died 1989)
October 31 – 
 Dale Evans, American actress (died 2001)
 Ollie Johnston, American animator (died 2008)
November 5 – Paul Dehn, English screenwriter and poet (died 1976)
November 8 – June Havoc, American actress (died 2010)
November 21 – Eleanor Powell, American dancer, actress (died 1982)
November 24 – Garson Kanin, American writer (died 1999)
December 11 – Carlo Ponti, Italian producer (died 2007)

Deaths
 March 30 – Karl May, writer, Apache Gold (born 1842)
 April 15 – Jacques Futrelle, writer, The Rivals of Sherlock Holmes, (perished in the Titanic) (born 1875)
 April 20 – Bram Stoker, writer, Dracula (born 1847)
 May 14 – August Strindberg, writer, Miss Julie (born 1849)
 May 19 – Bolesław Prus, writer, Faraon (born 1847)
 June 1 – Philip Parmalee, actor (with Mabel Normand in A Dash Through the Clouds); pioneer aviator for the Wright brothers (born 1887)
 July 1 – Harriet Quimby, writer (seven scenarios for D.W. Griffith); actress in one film; pioneer American aviator (born 1875)
 December 14 – Harry Cashman, comedy producer and actor for the Chicago-based Essanay company.

Film debuts
 John Barrymore – The Dream of a Moving Picture Director (as Jack Barrymore)
 Frank Borzage – On Secret Service (short)
 Charlotte Burton – The Would-Be Heir (short)
 Lon Chaney – The Honor of the Family (short) (unconfirmed)
 Dorothy Gish – An Unseen Enemy (short)
 Lillian Gish – An Unseen Enemy (short)
 Louise Glaum – Brave Heart's Hidden Love (short)
 Mildred Harris – The Post Telegrapher (short)
 Cleo Madison – A Business Buccaneer (short)
 Mary Miles Minter – The Nurse (short) (as Juliet Shelby)
 Antonio Moreno – Iola's Promise (short)
 Warner Oland – Pilgrim's Progress
 Olga Petrova – Departure of a Grand Old Man (short)
 Victor Sjöström – director, A Ruined Life; actor, The Gardener
 Frederick Warde – Richard III

References

 
Film by year